Juanfran is a hypocorism of the compound name Juan Francisco, it may refer to:
Juanfran (footballer, born 1976), Spanish football defender, born Juan Francisco García García
Juanfran (footballer, born 1985), Spanish football defender, born Juan Francisco Torres Belén
Juanfran (footballer, born 1988), Spanish football winger, born Juan Francisco Moreno Fuertes
Juan Francisco Guevara (born 1995), Spanish motorcycle racer

See also
Xisco, nickname for people have Francisco first name
List of all pages beginning with "Juan Francisco"

Spanish masculine given names